Passoni is an Italian surname. Notable people with the surname include:

Daniela Passoni, South African water polo player
Dario Passoni (born 1974), Italian footballer
Fabiana Passoni (born  1977), Brazilian singer

See also
Passini

Italian-language surnames